Julee Rosso is an American cook and food writer.  In 1977 she and Sheila Lukins opened and ran a gourmet food shop in New York City called The Silver Palate. In the 1980s they wrote The Silver Palate Cookbook, The Silver Palate Good Times Cookbook, and others.  A 25th Anniversary update of the Silver Palate Cookbook was published in 2007.

"She changed the way America eats." - New York Newsday

Early life
Julee Rosso graduated from Michigan State University where she was a member of the Beta Beta chapter of Alpha Phi.
Julee is currently the owner of the Wickwood Inn in Saugatuck, Michigan.

Books

with Sheila Lukins
The Silver Palate Cookbook, 1979
The Silver Palate Good Times Cookbook, 1984 (Winner, James Beard award "Entertaining" in 1986 )
The New Basics Cookbook, 1989
Silver Palate Desserts', 1995

By Julee RossoGreat Good Food, 1993Fresh Start, 1996Fresh Start for Meat & Fish , 1997Fresh Start for Vegetables, 1997Fresh Start for Grains & Pasta, 1997Fresh Start for Poultry, 1997Fresh Start for Soup, 1997Fresh Start for Fruit Fresh Start - Special Markets, 1996Fresh Start : Low fat Food and Menus Day to Day''

External links
 Author's website
 Rosso's culinary biography

American chefs
American food writers
Michigan State University alumni
Living people
Year of birth missing (living people)
James Beard Foundation Award winners
Chefs from New York City